Carl Ernst Otto Kuntze (23 June 1843 – 27 January 1907) was a German botanist.

Biography
Otto Kuntze was born in Leipzig.

An apothecary in his early career, he published an essay entitled Pocket Fauna of Leipzig. Between 1863 and 1866 he worked as tradesman in Berlin and traveled through central Europe and Italy. From 1868 to 1873 he had his own factory for essential oils and attained a comfortable standard of living. Between 1874 and 1876, he traveled around the world: the Caribbean, United States, Japan, China, South East Asia, Arabian peninsula and Egypt. The journal of these travels was published as "Around the World" (1881). From 1876 to 1878 he studied Natural Science in Berlin and Leipzig and gained his doctorate in Freiburg with a monography of the genus Cinchona.

He edited the botanical collection from his world voyage encompassing 7,700 specimens in Berlin and Kew Gardens. The publication came as a shock to botany, since Kuntze had entirely revised taxonomy. His three-volume treatise, 2,226 page total, Revisio Generum Plantarum (1891-1898) was widely rejected or deliberately ignored.

In 1886, Kuntze visited the Russian Near East and spent the 1887–88 period on the Canary Islands. The results of both journeys became part of his main work, the Revisio. At the beginning of the 1890s he left for South America, of which he managed to see nearly all countries. In 1894, he visited the Southern African countries as well as the German colonies. In the last years of his life, Kuntze moved permanently to Sanremo (Italy).

Although he stated that he was merely diligently applying standard practice, his revolutionary ideas about botanic nomenclature created a schism between competing sets of Rules of Botanical Nomenclature, the precursors of the modern International Code of Nomenclature for algae, fungi, and plants. The conflict came to a head at the 2nd International Botanical Congress in 1905, two years before Kuntze's death. His uncompromising responses to differing views meant that the doors of much of the academic world, particularly in Europe, were closed to him.

Even for an era in which botanical and mycological texts were quite formal and rigid in their style; Kuntze's writing stands out as being especially dense and impenetrable. This can be seen in Revisio generum plantarum which consists largely of exhaustive lists of species and entire genera which he proposed were to be moved. Potential sources for the schism between Kuntze and the academic world can be seen in examples such as his proposition that Michel Adanson's pre-Linnaean system genus Fungus should be resurrected for numerous Agaricus and Stropharia species. In many cases the species to be moved had already been reclassified numerous times with several proposed names but Kuntze appears to have disregarded these classifications and simply reclassified the basionym. As a result of this work, the taxonomic records are full of vast defunct genera in which not a single species name is currently accepted. Kuntze's major attempts at reclassification appear to have been influenced by the issues he saw with Linnaean taxonomy and perhaps even Linnaeus himself:

Whilst widely rejected, Kuntze's work cast a strong light on the inadequacy of previous approaches to botanical nomenclature. A group of American botanists developed an alternative set of rules, the Rochester Code, which they proposed in 1892 as an alternative to the International Rules. This schism was not resolved until 1930.

Biographical articles 

.

 .Barnhart John Hendley W.B. Hemsley

References

External links 
 .
 .
 .

Botanists with author abbreviations
1843 births
1907 deaths
20th-century German botanists
Scientists from Leipzig
Apothecaries